Nowshera Junction railway station is located in Nowshera city, Nowshera district of Khyber Pakhtunkhwa province, Pakistan.

See also
 List of railway stations in Pakistan
 Pakistan Railways

References

Railway stations in Nowshera District
Railway stations on Karachi–Peshawar Line (ML 1)
Railway stations on Nowshera–Dargai Railway Line